Hugh Miles may refer to:

 Hugh Miles (filmmaker), British filmmaker 
 Hugh Miles (journalist) (born 1977), British journalist